Rae Bertrum Blaemire (February 8, 1911, in Gary, Indiana – December 23, 1975, in Champaign, Illinois) was an American major league baseball player. He played in two games for the New York Giants during the 1941 baseball season. He later managed the Grand Forks Chiefs of the Northern League during the 1946 season.

External links

Baseball Almanac
Baseball Catchers page

1911 births
1975 deaths
Major League Baseball catchers
New York Giants (NL) players
Baseball players from Indiana
Minor league baseball managers
Nashville Vols players
Macon Peaches players
Wilkes-Barre Barons (baseball) players
Jersey City Giants players
Columbus Red Birds players
St. Paul Saints (AA) players
Grand Forks Chiefs players